The Matka class is the NATO reporting name for a group of hydrofoil missile boats built for the Soviet Navy (Baltic Fleet and Black Sea Fleet). The Soviet designation was Project 206MR Vikhr. Following the 1997 Black Sea Fleet partition treaty all Black Sea Fleet Matka class boats were passed to the Ukrainian Navy but the last vessel of the class was allegedly captured by Russia during its invasion of Ukraine in 2022.

Design
There is only a single foil, the aft part of the hull hydroplanes at high speeds. They are air-conditioned and NBC-sealed. The SS-N-2 launchers are the same type as carried on the Project 61MR ("Mod-Kashin")-class destroyers. Despite initial reports that they were good seaboats, later information revealed that the Soviets regarded them as cramped inside and top-heavy. Of thirteen planned ships, one was cancelled and another started but never completed. All were built in Leningrad.

After the breakup of the USSR, Russia discarded many and five went to Ukraine, one of which was later transferred to Georgia after a complete refurbishment.

Project 206.6
R-44 serves as a developmental ship for the Black Sea Fleet, and was the first vessel anywhere to carry the SS-N-25 "Switchblade" missile, in two quad-canisters. These were removed in 2000 but re-installed in 2003. In 1998, the SP-521 combat data system was installed. R-44 also has the AK-630М1-2 Roy CIWS which is two 30 mm gatling guns superimposed on each other, in place of the AK-630. More recently, the ship has been seen with no "Drum Tilt" radar and a large deckhouse between the bridge and mast.

Combat usage
On 9 August 2008 during the 2008 South Ossetia war, several media outlets reported that Tbilisi had been sunk in a nighttime action, either by a SS-N-9 "Siren" (likely from a  ship) or a SS-N-12 "Sandbox" (from the  ) fired by the Russian navy, which was moving a flotilla into position to enforce a  Total Exclusion Zone (TEZ) around the Georgian Navy's main homeport of Poti.

Tbilisi was in fact destroyed by Russian Airborne Troops on 8 August 2008 while in port at Poti. The ship lost at sea was most likely the  P-21 Giorgi Toreli. This would have appeared very similar on radar to a Matka-class vessel, having essentially the same hull and superstructure but different armament.

Trivia

In Russian language, the word "matka" (NATO given name) means literally "uterus". The word has also meaning "queen" (of insect hive), which is the most likely connotation, since previous missile boat classes were named Osa and Komar, meaning "wasp" and "mosquito".

Ships
A total of 12 boats were built for the Soviet Navy. A gun boat version without hydrofoils was offered for export.

  - 1 boat The Pryluky in service (2017); possibly captured by Russia in 2022
  - 1 boat The Tbilisi (თბილისი) transferred from Ukraine, sunk by the Russian Airborne troops in Poti port during the 2008 South Ossetia war

 Yellow  — possibly captured by Russia from the Ukrainian Navy
 Red  — decommissioned
 Black  — sunk

See also
List of ships of the Soviet Navy
List of ships of Russia by project number
, a Canadian hydrofoil intended for anti-submarine duties
, a Royal Navy jetfoil mine countermeasure vessel.
, a class of USN PHM
, a class of Soviet PHM
, a class of Italian PHM

References

Notes

Bibliography
 Also published as

External links
Project 206MR Vikhr missile boats
Complete Ship List of all Matka class missile boats

Missile boat classes
Hydrofoils
Missile boats of the Soviet Navy
 
Missile boats of the Russian Navy
 
Missile boats of the Ukrainian Navy
 
Missile boats of the Georgian Navy